The Amur ide (Leuciscus waleckii). also known as Amur chebak is a species of cyprinid fish, inhabiting the Amur River basin in Russia, Mongolia, China, Korea. The population found in Hulun Lake is capable of tolerating the very high levels of alkalinity in the lake. The transcriptome of the species has been sequenced in order to better understand this tolerance.

References 

Amur ide
Amur River
Freshwater fish of Asia
Amur ide